Florian Grillitsch (born 7 August 1995) is an Austrian professional footballer who plays as a midfielder or centre back for Dutch Eredivisie club Ajax and the Austria national team.

Career

Early career
Born in Neunkirchen, Austria on 7 August 1995, Grillitsch played for SVSF Pottschach and St. Pölten in his youth football career.

Werder Bremen

2013–15
Grillitsch joined Werder Bremen on 1 July 2013. He split the 2013–14 season between the Werder Bremen U19's youth team and Werder Bremen II. He made 15 appearances in the A-Junioren-Bundesliga Nord/Nordost scoring 11 goals and made five appearances in the Regionalliga Nord for Werder Bremen II. In the 2014–15 season, Grillitsch made 26 appearances scoring nine goals for Werder's reserve team.

2015–16 season
Grillitsch made his first team debut during the 2015–16 season. He played the full 120 minutes including extra-time in the 2–0 win against Würzburger Kickers in the first round of the DFB-Pokal on 8 August 2015, notably assisting Anthony Ujah for 1–0. His first Bundesliga match was a 3–0 loss to Schalke 04 on matchday one on 15 August 2015. He replaced the veteran Clemens Fritz after 70 minutes at 2–0. He also played for Werder Bremen II during the 2015–16 season. Grillitsch achieved his first assist in the Bundesliga as Werder beat Mainz 3–1 on 24 October 2015 setting up Fin Bartels for the third goal. He played the full 90 minutes. Four days later, Grillitsch prominently featured in Werder's 1–0 second-round DFB-Pokal victory over 1. FC Köln, providing a major goal-scoring chance for Ujah, playing multiple through-balls and almost scoring. Afterwards, he was voted "Man of the match" by the club's fans.

2016–17 season
On 18 March 2017, Grillitsch scored his second goal of the 2016–17 season in a 3–0 win against Leipzig, a match that saw all three of Werder Bremen's Austrian players score in the club's highest win of the season.

1899 Hoffenheim

On 16 January 2017, Grillitsch signed a contract with 1899 Hoffenheim until 2021, starting from the 2017–18 season.

Career statistics

Club

International 

Scores and results list Austria's goal tally first, score column indicates score after each Grillitsch goal.

References

External links

 Profile at tge AFC Ajax website

Living people
1995 births
Association football midfielders
Austrian footballers
Austria international footballers
Austria youth international footballers
Austria under-21 international footballers
Bundesliga players
3. Liga players
Regionalliga players
SV Werder Bremen players
SV Werder Bremen II players
TSG 1899 Hoffenheim players
AFC Ajax players
UEFA Euro 2020 players
Austrian expatriate footballers
Austrian expatriate sportspeople in Germany
Expatriate footballers in Germany
Expatriate footballers in the Netherlands
People from Neunkirchen District, Austria
Footballers from Lower Austria
Austrian expatriate sportspeople in the Netherlands